Vișina may refer to several places in Romania:

 Vișina, Dâmbovița, a commune in Dâmbovița County
 Vișina, Olt, a commune in Olt County
 Vișina Nouă, a commune in Olt County
 Vișina, a village in Poiana Commune, Galați County
 Vișina, a village in Greci Commune, Mehedinți County
 Vișina, a village in Jurilovca Commune, Tulcea County

See also 
 Vișinești, a commune in Dâmbovița County, southern Romania